Fudbalski klub Sloboda Novi Grad (Serbian Cyrillic: Фудбалски клуб Cлoбoдa Hoви Гpaд) is a football club from the town of Novi Grad, Republika Srpska, Bosnia and Herzegovina. The club competes in the First League of the Republika Srpska.

History
The club was founded in 1910 as SK Sloboda Bosanski Novi.

Players

Current squad

Historical list of managers
 Milan Vujasin
 Mirko Tintor
 Milorad Inđić
 Ernst Šabić
 Zoran Kondić
 Ljubiša Drljača
 Zlatko Jelisavac
 Duško Vranešević

References

External sources
FK Sloboda Novi Grad at FSRS

Football clubs in Bosnia and Herzegovina
Novi Grad, Bosnia and Herzegovina
Football clubs in Republika Srpska
Association football clubs established in 1910
1910 establishments in Bosnia and Herzegovina